Prof. Dani Koren (born 12 February 1945) is a former Israeli politician who briefly served as a member of the Knesset for the Labor Party in 2006.

Biography
The son of politician Yitzhak Coren, Dani studied at the Hebrew University of Jerusalem, gaining a BA in economics and political science, and an MA in political science. He went on to study for a PhD in government at the London School of Economics.

For the 2003 Knesset elections he was placed 30th on the Labor Party's list. Although he missed out on a seat when the party won only 19 seats, he entered the Knesset on 28 January 2006 as a replacement for Avi Yehezkel. He lost his seat in the March 2006 elections. In 2015 Koren gained an honorary professor title from the National University of Political Studies and Public Administration.

References

External links
 

1945 births
Hebrew University of Jerusalem Faculty of Social Sciences alumni
Alumni of the London School of Economics
Living people
Israeli chief executives
Israeli Labor Party politicians
Members of the 16th Knesset (2003–2006)